Phosphoribosylaminoimidazolesuccinocarboxamide (SAICAR) is an intermediate in the formation of purines. The conversion of ATP, L-aspartate, and 5-aminoimidazole-4-carboxyribonucleotide (CAIR) to 5-aminoimidazole-4-(N-succinylcarboxamide) ribonucleotide, ADP, and phosphate by phosphoribosylaminoimidazolesuccinocarboxamide synthetase (SAICAR synthetase) represents the eighth step of de novo purine nucleotide biosynthesis.

References

Nucleotides